John Christian Rosenlund (born July 26, 1964) is a Norwegian cinematographer. Through 25 years, he has been a cinematographer for about 25 feature films, several television series and about 700 to 800 commercials.

He received positive reviews on his work from the Hollywood Reporter and the Variety magazine for his work of cinematography in The King's Choice.

Filmography
Stella Days (2011)
A Thousand Times Good Night (2013)
The Wave (2015)
The Saboteurs (2015) (TV Series)
The King's Choice (2016)
Askeladden - I Dovregubbens Hall (2017)
The Middle Man (2021)
Paradise Highway (2022)

Awards and honors
In 2006, he was awarded with the Aamot Statue organized by Film & Kino.

References

External links 

Living people
1964 births
Norwegian cinematographers